Maximiliano Garafulic Alfred (6 August 1938 – 23 November 2007) was a Chilean basketball player. He competed in the men's tournament at the 1956 Summer Olympics.

References

External links

1938 births
2007 deaths
Chilean men's basketball players
1959 FIBA World Championship players
Olympic basketball players of Chile
Basketball players at the 1956 Summer Olympics
People from Antofagasta
20th-century Chilean people